KKNO (750 kHz) is a commercial AM radio station broadcasting an Urban Gospel radio format. Licensed to Gretna, Louisiana, the station serves the New Orleans metropolitan area. The station is currently owned by Robert C. Blakes Enterprises, Inc.  It uses the slogan "Unmistakably Christian Radio."

By day, KKNO is powered at 250 watts, using a non-directional antenna.  But because AM 750 is a clear channel frequency reserved for Class A WSB in Atlanta, KKNO is a daytimer.  To avoid interference, it must go off the air at night.  The transmitter is on Industry Street in Harvey, Louisiana.

History
On September 10, 1988, the station signed on the air.  As a construction permit, the unbuilt station was assigned the call letters KAIG on 1987-09-14. On 1988-12-12, the station changed its call sign to the current KKNO.

In 1993, it was acquired by Robert C. Blake Enterprises for $275,000.

References

External links

Gospel radio stations in the United States
Daytime-only radio stations in Louisiana
Christian radio stations in Louisiana